The Malaysian Open was a men's professional golf tournament that was played on the European Tour and the Asian Tour. 

Notable past winners include world number one golfers Vijay Singh and Lee Westwood (both players winning the event on two occasions). Other notable winners include 17-year-old Italian Matteo Manassero in 2011 as well as former Open champion Louis Oosthuizen the following year. PGA Tour winners including Harold Henning, Jeff Maggert, Glen Day, Steve Flesch, Arjun Atwal and Noh Seung-yul have also won the event. Since its inauguration there has never been a Malaysian winner.

History
The tournament was inaugurated in 1962 as the Malayan Open, and was one of the events on the first season of the Far East Circuit that year. In 1999 it joined the Asian Tour and also became part of the European Tour's expansion into Asia as a jointly sanctioned event.

The six events from 2010 to 2015 were held at the Kuala Lumpur Golf & Country Club. The 2015 champion was India's Anirban Lahiri. This was his first ever victory on the European Tour and it was his sixth win on the Asian Tour.

The tournament returned in 2020 after a four year hiatus. It was played as a sole-sanctioned Asian Tour event at Kota Permai Golf & Country Club. Trevor Simsby took the title in a playoff over Andrew Dodt and Jarin Todd. It was the final event played before the 2020–21–22 Asian Tour season was heavily disrupted by the COVID-19 pandemic.

Winners

Notes

References

External links
Coverage on the Asian Tour's official site
Coverage on the European Tour's official site

Former Asian Tour events
Former European Tour events
Asia Golf Circuit events
Golf tournaments in Malaysia
Recurring sporting events established in 1962